Găneasa is a commune in the east of Ilfov County, Muntenia, Romania. Its name is a feminine form of Gane, a Romanian name. It is composed of five villages: Cozieni, Găneasa, Moara Domnească, Piteasca and Șindrilița.

Natives
 Radu Aldulescu

References

Ganeasa
Localities in Muntenia

ro:Găneasa, Ilfov